This page is about the hit song recorded by Manfred Mann's Earth Band; for the Cozy Tapes song see Cozy Tapes Vol. 1: Friends.

"The Runner", also called simply "Runner", is a song written by Canadian rock musician Ian Thomas, his version released in 1981 on the album of the same name. It was also recorded by Manfred Mann's Earth Band, a group known for making hits of reworked cover songs, and released as a single in 1984. It reached number 22 on the Billboard Hot 100 in the US.

The Song 

Ian Thomas was a moderately successful artist in Canada, whose songs have been covered by bigger artists a number of times. He was inspired to write this song about Terry Fox, a Canadian hero who set off on a run across the country on one good leg and a prosthetic leg, having lost the other due to cancer. The run was to raise awareness of cancer and seeking funding for cancer research. Unfortunately, Fox only made it half-way through because he had to end his run due to medical concerns. "I wanted to capture that gallantry, the importance of passing on the flame," related Thomas. His version was included in the 1983 movie The Terry Fox Story.

This song was also covered by Sheila in 1981.

Manfred Mann's Earth Band version

The timing on the Manfred Mann's Earth Band version was especially good, as it came out right before the 1984 Olympics held in Los Angeles, prompting especially heavy play. Trevor Rabin, at that time the guitarist of the progressive rock band Yes, played the guitar solo on this track.

The video for this version, directed by Lindsey Clennell, received heavy airplay on MTV. In it, the band performs near a campfire at night (shot on a soundstage), interspersed with video of runners either racing, or carrying the Olympic torch, much of which was footage shot for the recent Olympic games in Munich and Montreal.

This version of the song was used in the film The Philadelphia Experiment.

The song was included on the American release of their 1984 album Somewhere in Afrika. With the 1998 series of remastered reissues, the song was instead appended to the reissue of Criminal Tango. It was also included on the compilations The Best of Manfred Mann's Earth Band Re-Mastered, Odds & Sods – Mis-takes & Out-takes, the Leftovers disc of the 40th Anniversary box set and the deluxe edition of Mannthology.

The single edit (which fades early) is rarer on CD, having only been reissued on The Complete Greatest Hits of Manfred Mann and the 50th anniversary release Mannthology.

Track listing
7" single
A. "Runner" (7" version) – 3:50
B. "No Transkei" 2:35

12" single
A. "Runner" (12" version) – 4:40
B. "No Transkei" 2:35
C. "Lies (Through the 80s)" 4:34

Both b-sides are taken from the Budapest Live concerts, although "No Transkei" (re-titled second part of the "Africa Suite") was originally only available on the cassette of the album. US releases retained the title "Where Do They Send Them", which had already been used on the Budapest Live cassette.  (The studio recording was called "To Bantustan?")

Personnel

Musicians
 Manfred Mann – keyboards, synthesisers
 John Lingwood – drums, percussion
 Chris Thompson – vocals
 Matt Irving – bass, programming (MC4)
 Mick Rogers – backup vocals
 Trevor Rabin – guitar solo

Technical
 Manfred Mann – producer
 Lars Finnstrom – engineer
 Terry Medhurst – engineer

References

1984 singles
1981 songs
Arista Records singles
Manfred Mann songs
Bronze Records singles
Songs written by Ian Thomas (Canadian musician)
Terry Fox